Bulgarian Sportsperson of the Year (Sportist na godinata na Balgariya) is an annual award given to the best Bulgarian sportsperson of the year. The winner is selected by authorized journalists. The award was established by the Naroden Sport newspaper and specifically by Aleksandar Yasnikov. It was first given in 1958 to the basketball player Vanya Voynova. The person with the most awards is high-jumper Stefka Kostadinova with four. Traditionally, the award is given at the Sportsperson of the Year Ball which is attended by journalists, sportspeople, social figures, intellectuals, etc.

Bulgarian Sportspeople of the Year

External links
Bulgarian Sportsperson of the Year website 

National sportsperson-of-the-year trophies and awards
Sportsperson
Sport in Bulgaria
Awards established in 1958
1958 establishments in Bulgaria
Annual events in Bulgaria